Francis Edwin Shober (March 12, 1831 – May 29, 1896) was an American politician who served as U.S. Representative from North Carolina, secretary of the United States Senate, county judge, and a member of the North Carolina State House and North Carolina House of Commons. He was the father of Francis Emanuel Shober.

Born in Salem (now Winston-Salem), North Carolina, Shober attended the common schools and the Moravian School, Bethlehem, Pennsylvania.
He was graduated from the University of North Carolina at Chapel Hill in 1851.
He studied law.
He was admitted to the bar in 1853 and commenced practice in Salisbury, North Carolina, in 1854.  He served as member of the North Carolina General Assembly of 1862-1864 House of Commons (18621864).  He served in the North Carolina General Assembly of 1865-1866 state senate in 1865.

Shober was elected as a Democrat to the Forty-first and Forty-second Congresses (March 4, 1869 – March 3, 1873).
He was not a candidate for renomination in 1872.
He served as delegate to the State constitutional convention in 1875.
County judge of Rowan County in 1877 and 1878.
He was appointed Chief Clerk of the United States Senate in the Forty-fifth Congress.
Upon the death of Secretary John C. Burch in the Forty-seventh Congress was appointed Acting Secretary of the Senate and served from October 24, 1881, to December 18, 1883.
He served as delegate to the Democratic National Conventions in 1880 and 1884.
He was again a member of the State senate in 1887.
He resumed the practice of his profession.
He died in Salisbury, North Carolina, May 29, 1896.
He was interred in Oakdale Cemetery.
On January 6, 1889, James Francis Shober, the first black physician with a medical degree to set up practice in North Carolina, died.

Evidence indicates that he had a son, James Francis  Shober from  an 18-year-old slave.  His son  was born in the Moravian community of Salem in 1853 and was the first documented African-American physician in NC.

References

External links

 

1831 births
1896 deaths
Democratic Party members of the North Carolina House of Representatives
Democratic Party North Carolina state senators
Democratic Party members of the United States House of Representatives from North Carolina
19th-century American politicians
Secretaries of the United States Senate